Hillside Avenue Historic District may refer to:

Hillside Avenue Historic District (Medford, Massachusetts), listed on the National Register of Historic Places (NRHP)
Hillside Avenue Historic District (Plainfield, New Jersey), listed on the NRHP in Union County, New Jersey